Lo Prado is a Chilean commune located in Santiago, which is itself part of the Metropolitan region of Chile. It is part of the Greater Santiago urban area.

Demographics
The population fell by 6% (6617 persons) between the 1992 and 2002 censuses. Its 2006 projected population was 98,983.

Stats
Average annual household income: US$26,950 (PPP, 2006)
Population below poverty line: 11.6% (2006)
Regional quality of life index: 81.80, high, 7 out of 52 (2005)
Human Development Index: 0.715, 100 out of 341 (2003)

Administration
As a commune, Lo Prado is a third-level administrative division of Chile administered by a municipal council, headed by an alcalde who is directly elected every four years. The 2012-2016 alcalde is Gonzalo Navarrete Muñoz (PPD). The communal council has the following members:
 Nicolás Navarrete Hernández (PPD)
 Juan Labra Sanhueza (RN)
 Dino Girardi Lavín (PPD)
 Juana Maturana González (PPD)
 Cynthia Calderón Rodríguez (DC)
 Silvia Valdivia Matus (PC)
 Jimmy Arce Leiva (PS)
 Gerónimo Flores Gómez (UDI)

Within the electoral divisions of Chile, Lo Prado is represented in the Chamber of Deputies by Nicolás Monckeberg (RN) and Cristina Girardi (PPD) as part of the 18th electoral district, (together with Cerro Navia and Quinta Normal). The commune is represented in the Senate by Guido Girardi Lavín (PPD) and Jovino Novoa Vásquez (UDI) as part of the 7th senatorial constituency (Santiago-West).

References

Populated places in Santiago Province, Chile
Geography of Santiago, Chile
Communes of Chile
Populated places established in 1981